The Pillsbury Bake-Off is an American cooking contest, first run by the Pillsbury Company in 1949. It has been called "one of the most successful promotions in the history of the modern food business".

History
The first contest was held in 1949 as the Grand National Recipe and Baking Contest and hosted in the Waldorf-Astoria Hotel. One hundred entires were selected for the final competition (97 women and 3 men). Pillsbury paid all expenses to fly in and host the contestants. At the awards banquet, Eleanor Roosevelt presented the winner with a $50,000 check. Every contestant received at least $100 for their recipe and took home the G.E. electric stove used in the competition. All of the recipes were published in a booklet distributed to grocers nationwide. The only required ingredient in the early contests was Pillsbury's BEST Flour. 

The contest was held annually from 1949–1976, 2013 to 2014, and since 2017; from 1978 to 2012, the contest was held biennially.  There was no contest in 1965 because the contest was moved from October to February. There was no contest in 2015, 2016 nor 2020. The contest reverted to an annual contest in 2013 and 2014, after the previous 18 contests were held in even-numbered years. Although the 2021 contest was held virtually, the Food Network aired the contest from New York, NY.

From 1996 to 2014, the grand prize was $1,000,000. From 2018 to 2019, the grand prize was $50,000 plus a kitchen makeover from GE Appliances. Occasionally, there has been a male category winner (1978, 1990, 1992, and 2002). The only male champion was Kurt Wait of Redwood City, California, who won in 1996; that year, 14 of the 100 finalists were men.

In 2014, the contest added eight additional "Sponsor Awards" for a prize of $5,000 each. Categories and winners included:

 GE Imagination At Work Award: won by MaryJo Watkins of Scottsdale, Arizona – Muffuletta Mini Pies
 Jif Peanut Butter Award: won by Brenda Watts of Gaffney, South Carolina – Macaroon-Peanut Butter-Chocolate Tartlets
 Crisco is Cooking Award: won by Greg Fontenot of The Woodlands, Texas – Grilled Potato and Roasted Salsa Verde Pizza
 Eagle Brand Signature Recipe Award: won by Barbara Estabrook of Rhinelander, Wisconsin – Peanut and Pretzel-Peanut Butter Thumbprints
 Pillsbury Gluten Free Award: won by Merry Graham of Newhall, California – Herbs and Seeds Parmesan Crackers
 Pillsbury Clever Twist Award: won by Marie Valdes of Brandon, Florida – Spinach Dip-Stuffed Garlic Rolls
 Watkins Vanilla Award: won by Antoinette Leal of Ridgefield, Connecticut – Very Vanilla Lemon Tarts
 Reynolds Baking Magic Award: won by Elizabeth Bennett of Seattle, Washington – Chocolate-Peanut Butter-Filled Pretzels

Grand prize winners

Broadcast

Location held
1949–56, 1958, 1962, since 2018: Manhattan, New York, NY
1957, 1959, 1961, 1963, 1967: Los Angeles, CA
1960:  Washington DC
1964, 1980: Miami, FL
1966, 1975, 2000: San Francisco, CA
1967, Century City, CA
1968, 1996, 2008: Dallas, TX
1969: Atlanta, GA
1970, 1984, 1988, 1994: San Diego, CA
1971: Honolulu, HI
1972: Houston, TX
1973, 2004: Hollywood, CA
1974, 1990: Phoenix, AZ
1976: Boston, MA
1978: New Orleans, LA
1982: San Antonio, TX
1986, 1992, 1998, 2002, 2006, 2010, 2012: Orlando, FL
2013: Las Vegas, NV
2014: Nashville, TN

Notes

References

External links
Pillsbury website
Pillsbury Bake-Off website

Cooking competitions in the United States
General Mills